Anna Amendola (December 23, 1931 - August 31, 2019) was an Italian actress. She appeared in more than ten films from 1952 to 1958. Amendola died on August 31, 2019, in Rome, Italy.

Selected filmography

References

External links 

1927 births
2019 deaths
Italian film actresses
20th-century Italian actresses